Steveston—Richmond East is a federal electoral district in British Columbia. It encompasses a portion of British Columbia previously included in the electoral districts of Delta—Richmond East and Richmond.

The riding consists of the eastern part of Richmond, British Columbia and the western part of Richmond south of Steveston Highway, including Steveston.

Steveston—Richmond East was created by the 2012 federal electoral boundaries redistribution and was legally defined in the 2013 representation order. It came into effect upon the call of the 2015 Canadian federal election, scheduled for October 2015.

Demographics

Members of Parliament
This riding has elected the following members of the House of Commons of Canada:

Election results

Notes

References

British Columbia federal electoral districts
Federal electoral districts in Greater Vancouver and the Fraser Valley
Politics of Richmond, British Columbia